Ackley is an English surname. Notable people with the surname include:

 A.H. Ackley (1887–1960), American musician and composer
 B.D. Ackley (1872–1958), American musician and composer
 Brian Ackley (born 1986), American footballer
 Danielle Ackley-McPhail (born 1967), American author and editor
 Dustin Ackley (born 1988), American baseball player
 Edward Ackley (1887–1964), American politician
 Fritz Ackley (1937–2002), American baseball player
 Gardner Ackley (1915–1998), American economist and diplomat
 Henry M. Ackley (1827–1912), American politician
 Jonathan Ackley, American video game designer, writer, and programmer
 P.O. Ackley (1903–1989), American gunsmith, barrel maker, author, columnist, and wildcat cartridge developer

References 

English-language surnames